"I've Got to Go Now" is a song written by David Ricketts and Toni Childs and released as the first single from Childs' second album, House of Hope (1991). The lyrics tell a tale of a woman leaving an abusive relationship. In a review of House of Hope, Tom Demalon of AllMusic said, "Childs dramatic vocals imbue the protagonist with willful, albeit fragile, resolve and a spirit that is moving".

The song was a commercial success in Australia, reaching number five on the ARIA Singles Chart, and it also peaked at number 19 in New Zealand. It has since been certified gold in Australia for shipments exceeding 35,000 copies. The song was not as successful worldwide, only reaching number 78 in Germany.

Track listings
Australasian CD and cassette single, UK 7-inch single
 "I've Got to Go Now"
 "Three Days"

UK CD single
 "I've Got to Go Now"
 "Don't Walk Away" (extended remix)
 "Three Days"

UK 12-inch single
A1. "I've Got to Go Now" (alternate ending) – 4:40
A2. "Three Days" – 4:15
B1. "Don't Walk Away" (extended remix) – 7:32

European CD single
 "I've Got to Go Now" – 4:40
 "Zimbabwe" (remix) – 6:25
 "Three Days" – 4:14

Charts

Weekly charts

Year-end charts

Certifications

References

1991 songs
1991 singles
A&M Records singles
Polydor Records singles
Songs written by David Ricketts